Old Malayalam, inscriptional language found in Kerala from c. 9th to c. 13th century AD, is the earliest attested form of Malayalam. The language was employed in several official records and transactions (at the level of the Chera Perumal kings as well as the upper-caste village temples). Old Malayalam was mostly written in Vatteluttu script (with Pallava/Southern Grantha characters). Most of the inscriptions were found from the northern districts of Kerala, those lie adjacent to Tulu Nadu. The origin of Malayalam calendar dates back to year 825 CE.

The existence of Old Malayalam is sometimes disputed by scholars. They regard the Chera Perumal inscriptional language as a diverging dialect or variety of contemporary Tamil.

History 
The start of the development of Old Malayalam from a western dialect of Middle Tamil can be dated to c. 7th - 8th century AD. It remained a west coast dialect until c. 9th century AD or a little later.

The formation of the language is mainly attributed to geographical separation of Kerala from the Tamil country and the influence of immigrant Tulu-Canarese Brahmins in Kerala (who also knew Sanskrit and Prakrit).

The later evolution of Old Malayalam is visible in the inscriptions dated to c. 9th to c. 12th century AD.

Differences from contemporary  Tamil 
Although Old Malayalam closely resembles contemporary Tamil it also shows characteristic new features. Major differences between Old Malayalam (the Chera Perumal inscriptional language) and contemporary inscriptional/literary Tamil of the eastern country are:

 Nasalisation of adjoining sounds
 Substitution of palatal sounds for dental sounds
 Contraction of vowels
 Rejection of gender verbs
Old Malayalam was still described by scholars as "Tamil", also "mala-nattu Tamil" (a "desya-bhasa").

Literary compositions 
There is no Old Malayalam literature preserved from this period (c. 9th to c. 12th century AD). Some of the earliest Malayalam literary compositions appear after this period.

These include the Bhasa Kautiliya, the Ramacaritam, and the Thirunizhalmala. The Bhasa Kautiliya is generally dated to a period after 11th century AD. Ramacaritam, which was written by certain Ciramakavi who, according to poet Ulloor S. P. Iyer, was Sri Virarama Varman. However the claim that it was written in Southern Kerala is expired on the basis of modern discoveries. Other experts, like Chirakkal T Balakrishnan Nair, Dr. K.M. George, M. M. Purushothaman Nair, and P.V. Krishnan Nair, state that the origin of the book is in Kasaragod district in North Malabar region. They cite the use of certain words in the book and also the fact that the manuscript of the book was recovered from Nileshwaram in North Malabar. The influence of Ramacharitam is mostly seen in the contemporary literary works of Northern Kerala. The words used in Ramacharitam such as Nade (Mumbe), Innum (Iniyum), Ninna (Ninne), Chaaduka (Eriyuka) are special features of the dialect spoken in North Malabar (Kasaragod-Kannur region). Furthermore, the Thiruvananthapuram mentioned in Ramacharitham is not the Thiruvananthapuram in Southern Kerala. But it is Ananthapura Lake Temple of Kumbla in the northernmost Kasaragod district of Kerala. The word Thiru is used just by the meaning Honoured. Today it is widely accepted that Ramacharitham was written somewhere in North Malabar (most likely near Kasaragod). Ramacaritam is regarded as "the first literary work in Malayalam". According to Hermann Gundert, who compiled the first dictionary of the Malayalam language, Ramacaritam shows the 'ancient style' of the Malayalam language.

Folk Songs
For the first 600 years of the Malayalam calendar, Malayalam literature remained in a preliminary stage. During this time, Malayalam literature consisted mainly of various genres of songs (Pattu). Folk songs are the oldest literary form in Malayalam. They were just oral songs. Many of them were related to agricultural activities, including Pulayar Pattu, Pulluvan Pattu, Njattu Pattu, Koythu Pattu, etc. Other Ballads of Folk Song period include the Vadakkan Pattukal (Northern songs) in North Malabar region and the Thekkan Pattukal (Southern songs) in Southern Travancore. Some of the earliest Mappila songs (Muslim songs) were also folk songs.

Old Malayalam inscriptions 
Old Malayalam was an inscriptional language. No literary works in Old Malayalam have been found so far with the possible exceptions such as Ramacharitam and Thirunizhalmala. Some of the discovered inscriptions in Old Malayalam are listed below on the basis of their expected chronological order, also including their locations and key contents. Most of them are written in a mixture of Vatteluttu and Grantha scripts.

Old Malayalam epigraphic records

References

Further reading
 
 
 

Malayalam language
Dravidian languages